Paramamoea is a genus of South Pacific intertidal spiders first described by Raymond Robert Forster & C. L. Wilton in 1973.

Species
 it contains ten species, all found in New Zealand:
Paramamoea aquilonalis Forster & Wilton, 1973 – New Zealand
Paramamoea arawa Forster & Wilton, 1973 – New Zealand
Paramamoea incerta Forster & Wilton, 1973 – New Zealand
Paramamoea incertoides Forster & Wilton, 1973 – New Zealand
Paramamoea insulana Forster & Wilton, 1973 – New Zealand
Paramamoea pandora Forster & Wilton, 1973 – New Zealand
Paramamoea paradisica Forster & Wilton, 1973 – New Zealand
Paramamoea parva Forster & Wilton, 1973 – New Zealand
Paramamoea urewera Forster & Wilton, 1973 – New Zealand
Paramamoea waipoua Forster & Wilton, 1973 – New Zealand

References

Araneomorphae genera
Desidae
Spiders of New Zealand
Taxa named by Raymond Robert Forster